Leptaxis nivosa is a species of air-breathing land snail, a terrestrial pulmonate gastropod mollusk in the family Helicidae, the typical snails. It is endemic to Madeira.

Anatomy
These snails create and use love darts as part of their mating behavior.

References

Taxonomy at: 
Images at: 

Leptaxis
Endemic fauna of Madeira
Taxa named by Richard Thomas Lowe
Gastropods described in 1831

pt:Leptaxis